The 2018 NATC trials season was the 45th season. It consisted of ten trials events in three main classes: Pro, Expert and Womens Pro. It began on 21 April, with round one in New Mexico and ended with round ten in California on 2 September.

Season summary
Patrick Smage would claim his tenth NATC Trials Championship in 2018.

Josh Roper would claim his first NATC Trials Championship Expert class title in 2018.

2018 NATC trials season calendar

Scoring system
Points were awarded to the top twenty finishers in each class. All ten rounds counted for the Pro class, and the best of nine in Expert and Women's Pro classes were counted.

NATC Pro final standings

{|
|

NATC Expert final standings

{|
|

NATC Women's Pro final standings

{|
|

References

Motorcycle trials